William Ferdinand Alphonse Turgeon,  (June 3, 1877 – January 11, 1969) was a Canadian politician and judge in the Province of Saskatchewan.  He also served as a diplomat for the Government of Canada.

Early life 

Turgeon was born in Petit-Rocher, New Brunswick, the son of prominent Canadian politician Onésiphore Turgeon.  His brother, James Gray Turgeon, was also a politician in Alberta.  The three family members held public office concurrently between the years 1911 and 1921.

Turgeon received his early education in New York, and was awarded a Bachelor of Arts degree from Université Laval in 1900. He was called to the New Brunswick Bar in 1902. He moved to Prince Albert, Saskatchewan, the judicial centre for the North-West Territories, where he started a law practice and became a Crown prosecutor.

Politician

He was a member of the Legislative Assembly of Saskatchewan for the ridings of Prince Albert City (1907–1908), Duck Lake (1908–1912), and Humboldt (1912–1921). From 1912 to 1918, he was the Provincial Secretary. From 1907 to 1921, he was the Attorney General.  He is credited with having created the foundations of administrative and municipal legislation in the province.

Justice of the Court of Appeal

From 1921 to 1938, he was a Justice of the Saskatchewan Court of Appeal and from 1938 to 1941 he was the Chief Justice of Saskatchewan. In 1941, he was sworn into the Queen's Privy Council for Canada.

Diplomat

From 1941 to 1957, he held diplomatic posts mostly as the Canadian ambassador to Argentina, Chile, Mexico, Belgium, Luxembourg, Ireland, and Portugal.

After returning to Canada, he undertook a one-man inquiry into the Workers Compensation Board of Manitoba in 1958.

Honours

In 1940, he was awarded an honorary Doctor of Laws from the University of Saskatchewan. In 1967, he was made an Officer of the Order of Canada "for over a half century of service to his country". The W.F.A. Turgeon Catholic Community School in Prince Albert, Saskatchewan is named in his honour.

References

1877 births
1969 deaths
Acadian people
Members of the King's Privy Council for Canada
Officers of the Order of Canada
People from Gloucester County, New Brunswick
Judges in Saskatchewan
Saskatchewan Liberal Party MLAs
Université Laval alumni
Attorneys-General of Saskatchewan
Persons of National Historic Significance (Canada)
Ambassadors of Canada to Argentina
Ambassadors of Canada to Chile
Ambassadors of Canada to Mexico
Ambassadors of Canada to Belgium
Ambassadors of Canada to Luxembourg
High Commissioners of Canada to Ireland
Ambassadors of Canada to Ireland
Ambassadors of Canada to Portugal
Canadian King's Counsel